This list comprises all players who have participated in at least one league match for Orlando City B since the team's first USL season in 2016.

A "†" denotes players who only appeared in a single match.

Accurate as of match played April 24, 2022.

A
 Neicer Acosta (2022–present)
 Raul Aguilera (2020)
 Gonzalo Agustoni-Chagas (2022–present)
 Kevin Alston (2017)
 Mikey Ambrose (2016)
 Austin Amer (2019–2020)
 Austin Aviza (2020)

B
 Will Bagrou (2019)
 Hadji Barry (2016–2017)
 Jordan Bender (2019–2020)
 David Boccuzzo (2022–present)
 Luke Boden (2016)
 Mauro Bravo (2022–present)

C
 Kyle Callan-McFadden (2016)
 Franklin Carabalí (2020)
 Zach Carroll (2017)
 Paul Clowes (2017)
 Michael Cox (2016–2017)
 Isaque Couto (2016)

D
 Pierre da Silva (2016–2017)
 Danny Deakin (2017)
 Joey DeZart (2020–present)
 Albert Dikwa (2017)
 Ates Diouf (2019)
 Conor Donovan (2016–2017)

E
 Earl Edwards Jr. (2016–2017)
 Zachary Ellis-Hayden (2016–2017)
 William Eyang (2016)

F
 Fablo (2020)
 Jake Fenlason (2016–2017)
 Jahlane Forbes (2019–2020)
 Andrew Forth (2022–present)
 Theo Franca (2022–present)
 Alex Freeman (2022–present)

G
 Joe Gallardo (2017)
 Alejandro García (2016)
 Devron García (2016)
 Aleksandar Gluvačević (2020)
 Alejandro Granados (2022–present)
 Luc Granitur (2019)
 Quembol Guadalupe (2022–present)
 Erick Gunera-Calix (2022–present)
 Liam Guske (2022–present)
 Owen Guske (2020)

H
 Brandon Hackenberg (2022–present)
 Emmanuel Hagan (2019)
 Landen Haig (2016)
 Michael Halliday (2020–present)
 Harrison Heath (2016)
 Steven Hernandez (2019)
 Christian Herrera (2019)
 Cristian Higuita (2016)
 Jordan Hill (2019)
 Seb Hines (2017)
 Tanner Hummel (2019)

J
 Sebastian Joffre (2019)
 Brandon John (2019)
 Juliano (2019)

K
 Julian Kennedy (2020)
 Ryley Kraft (2017)

L
 Mason Lamb (2020)
 Richie Laryea (2016–2017)
 David Loera (2016–2017)
 Brian Lopez (2022–present)
 Jack Lynn (2022–present)

M
 Luca Mancuso † (2019)
 Austin Martz (2017)
 Antonio Matarazzo (2016)
 Tresor Mbuyu (2019)
 Jonathan Mendoza (2016)
 Randy Mendoza (2019)
 Juan Pablo Monticelli (2020)

N
 Theodore Ndje (2020)
 Lewis Neal (2016–2017)
 Craig Nitti (2016)

O
 Marius Obekop (2016)
 Nick O'Callaghan (2020)
 Lucas Ontivero (2019)
 Koby Osei-Wusu (2019)
 Javier Otero (2020–present)
 Adam Ozeri (2020)

P
 Diego Pareja (2022–present)
 PC (2017)
 Léo Pereira (2017)
 Ben Polk (2017)

Q
 José Quintero (2019–2020)

R
 Rafael Ramos (2016–2017)
 Tommy Redding (2016–2017)
 Andrew Ribeiro (2016)
 Pedro Ribeiro (2016)
 Mark Ridgers (2016)
 Wilfredo Rivera (2020–present)
 Tony Rocha (2016–2017)
 Bryan Róchez (2016)
 Mateo Rodas (2020)
 Jonathan Rosales (2020)
 Daniel Rosario (2020)

S
 Moussa Sane (2017)
 Rafael Santos (2019)
 Josh Saunders (2017)
 Jordan Schweitzer (2017)
 AJ Seals (2017)
 Sérginho (2019)
 Ian Silva (2022–present)
 Matheus Silva (2019)
 Léo Simas (2019)
 Nathan Simeon (2019)
 Keegan Smith (2016)
 Thiago de Souza (2019)
 Mason Stajduhar (2020)

T
 Moises Tablante (2019–present)
 Kenji Tanaka (2020)
 Nick Taylor (2022–present)
 Scott Thomsen (2017)
 Fernando Timbó (2017)
 Tyler Turner (2016)

V
 Owen Van Marter (2022–present)

W
 Thomas Williams (2020–present)
 Wilfred Williams (2019)

Y
 Victor Yan (2022–present)
 Jules Youmeni (2017)

References

External links

Orlando City B
 
Association football player non-biographical articles